Everyone Says I Love You is a 1996 American musical film written and directed by Woody Allen. It stars Allen, Alan Alda, Drew Barrymore, Goldie Hawn, Edward Norton, Julia Roberts, Tim Roth, Natasha Lyonne, and Natalie Portman. Set in New York City, Venice and Paris, it features singing by actors not usually known for musical roles. The film was a commercial failure, but is among the more critically successful of Allen's films, with Chicago Sun-Times critic Roger Ebert even ranking it as one of Allen's best.

Plot
The emotions of an extended upper-class family in Manhattan are followed in songs at New York, Paris and Venice. Various characters act, interact and sing in each cities. They include young lovers Holden and Skylar, her parents Bob and Steffi, her ex-husband Joe, Joe and Steffi's daughter Djuna, Von, a lady whom Joe meets, and a recently released prison inmate, Charles Ferry, who is inserted between them, leading to their breakup.

Cast

 Alan Alda as Bob Dandridge
 Woody Allen as Joe Berlin
 Drew Barrymore as Skylar Dandridge (singing voice dubbed by Olivia Hayman) 
 Lukas Haas as Scott Dandridge
 Goldie Hawn as Steffi Dandridge
 Gaby Hoffmann as Lane Dandridge
 Natasha Lyonne as Djuna "D.J." Berlin
 Edward Norton as Holden Spence
 Natalie Portman as Laura Dandridge
 Julia Roberts as Von Sidell
 Tim Roth as Charles Ferry
 David Ogden Stiers as Arnold Spence
 Itzhak Perlman as himself
 Edward Hibbert as a Harry Winston Salesman
 Patrick Cranshaw as Grandpa
 Billy Crudup as Ken Risley
 Robert Knepper as Greg
 Scotty Bloch as Lynn Spence
 Isiah Whitlock as Cop
 Kevin Hagan as Doorman
 Navah Perlman as Pianist
 Waltrudis Buck as Psychiatrist
 Christy Carlson Romano as a Trick or Treat Child
 Tim Jerome as X-ray Room Doctor
 Arlene Martell as a Nurse
 Singers: Helen Miles, Arlene Martell, Emily Bindiger, Cindy Cobitt, Al Dana, Kevin DeSimone, Paul Evans, Chrissy Faith, Jeff Lyons, Michael Mark, Jenna Miles, Robert Ragaini, Lenny Roberts, Annette Sanders, Terry Textor, Vaneese Thomas and Ashley H. Wilkinson

Music
The film uses classic songs for each scenes and in some cases with unexpected dance routines. 
 "Just You, Just Me" (Jesse Greer, Raymond Klages) — Edward Norton
 "My Baby Just Cares For Me" (Walter Donaldson, Gus Kahn) — Edward Norton/Natasha Lyonne
 "Recurrence/I'm a Dreamer, Aren't We All" (Ray Henderson, Lew Brown, B.G. DeSylva) — Dick Hyman/Olivia Hayman
 "Makin' Whoopee" (Donaldson, Kahn) — Tim Jerome
 "Venetian Scenes/I'm Through With Love" (Kahn, Matt Malneck, Fud Livingston) — Dick Hyman/Woody Allen
 "All My Life" (Sam Stept, Sidney Mitchell) — Julia Roberts
 "Just You, Just Me" (Salsa Version) (Greer, Klages) — Dick Hyman and the New York Studio Players
 "Cuddle Up a Little Closer" (Karl Hoschna, Otto Harbach) — Billy Crudup/Sanjeev Ramabhadran
 "Looking at You" (Cole Porter) — Alan Alda
 "Recurrence/If I Had You" (Ted Shapiro, Jimmy Campbell, Reg Connelly) — Dick Hyman/Tim Roth
 "Enjoy Yourself (It's Later than You Think)" (Carl Sigman, Herb Magidson) — Patrick Crenshaw
 "Chiquita Banana" (Leonard McKenzie, Garth Montgomery, William Wirges) — Christy Carlson Romano
 "Hooray for Captain Spaulding/Vive Le Capitaine Spaulding" (Bert Kalmar, Harry Ruby, Philippe Videcoq) — The Helen Miles Singers
 "I'm Through with Love" (Kahn, Malneck, Livingston) — Goldie Hawn/Edward Norton
 "Everyone Says I Love You" (Kalmar, Ruby) — The Helen Miles Singers

Most of the performers sing in their own voices, with two exceptions: Goldie Hawn, who was told by Allen to intentionally sing worse because she sang too well to be believable as a normal person just breaking into song, and Drew Barrymore, who convinced Allen that her singing was too awful even for the "realistic singing voice" concept he was going for. Her voice was dubbed by Olivia Hayman.

The title song was written by Bert Kalmar and Harry Ruby, and was used as a recurring theme song in the Marx Brothers movie Horse Feathers (1932). Allen is a well-known Groucho Marx fan. Marx's theme song from Animal Crackers (1930) "Hooray for Captain Spaulding" is featured, sung in French by a chorus of Groucho Marxes. The songs, film score, and subsequent album were recorded, mixed, and co-produced by Dick Hyman and Roy Yokelson.

Release

Box office
The film was released in North America on December 8, 1996 on three screens. Its opening weekend gross was $131,678 ($43,892 per screen). It ended with the run with $9,759,200.

Critical reception
The film was well received. On Rotten Tomatoes, the film has a 77% "fresh" rating, based on 44 reviews, with an average rating of 7.2/10. The site's consensus states: "A likable, infectious musical, Woody Allen's Everyone Says I Love You is sometimes uneven but always toe-tapping and fun." Janet Maslin wrote a strongly positive review in The New York Times, describing the film as "a delightful and witty compendium of the film maker's favorite things." Among the film's strongest detractors was Jonathan Rosenbaum, who described it as "creepy" and claimed "this characterless world of Manhattan-Venice-Paris, where love consists only of self-validation, and political convictions of any kind are attributable to either hypocrisy or a brain condition, the me-first nihilism of Allen's frightened worldview is finally given full exposure, and it's a grisly thing to behold."

Awards
The film was nominated for Best Motion Picture – Musical or Comedy at the 54th Golden Globe Awards.

References

External links

 
 Everyone Says I Love You at Virtual History

1996 films
1996 romantic comedy films
1990s musical comedy films
1990s romantic musical films
American musical comedy films
American romantic comedy films
American romantic musical films
Cultural depictions of the Marx Brothers
Films directed by Woody Allen
Films produced by Robert Greenhut
Films set in New York City
Films set in Paris
Films set in Venice
Films shot in New York City
Films shot in Paris
Films shot in Venice
Films with screenplays by Woody Allen
Jukebox musical films
Miramax films
1990s English-language films
1990s American films